The Beer Party (BIER) is an Austrian minor party and satirical party. Founded in 2014, it was originally known as the Beer Party of Austria (Bierpartei Österreich) and used the corresponding abbreviation BPÖ until its renaming in 2020. The party's activity is confined to Vienna, where BIER first appeared on ballots in the 2019 Austrian legislative election and appeared again in the 2020 Viennese state election. As of 2020, it has been unable to amass the votes required for representation in the National Council, Federal Council, or the Landtage, claiming 0.6% of Viennese votes in 2019 and 1.8% in 2020. However, the party was able to win mandates in 11 of Vienna's districts. The party is organized purely at the federal level without state parties.

History 
Beer Parties exist throughout the world, especially in Eastern Europe. Already in the last 1990 East German general election, the electoral list of the "German Beer Drinkers' Union" (Deutsche Biertrinker Union) had been presented in the constituency of Rostock, which had only obtained 2,534 votes and no elected persons, in addition to a handful of votes in five other local elections in the German federal states. Another well-known example was the Polish Beer-Lovers' Party, which started as a prank and won 2.97% of the vote and 16 seats in the Sejm after Poland's 1991 parliamentary elections, even joining the government of Hanna Suchocka with its own minister. Such parties are satirical as a general rule, though they can develop more serious platforms, as was the case for the Polish Beer-Lover's Party.

Austria's Beer Party was founded in 2014 by Marco Pogo, the frontman of the Viennese punk rock band Turbobier. Pogo, whose legal name is Dominik Wlazny, holds a medical degree and was a practising medical doctor before the success of his band led him to change careers. The idea for the Beer Party likely grew out of a song, "Die Bierpartei," which appeared on Turbobier's debut album, Irokesentango. In an interview with Kulturwoche.at, Pogo stated that "the country needs a strong movement—a strong movement for beer... I did it for the country." He also went on to state that his continuing involvement in politics is inspired by the 2019 Ibiza Affair.

2019 legislative election 
The Beer Party (then still operating as BPÖ) did not take part in elections during the first four years following its establishment. In 2019, it capitalized on the satirical potential of the Ibiza Affair and advertised itself with giveaways of free beer in order to gain the declarations of support (Unterstützungserklärungen) necessary for participation in the election. As one motivation for its candidacy, the party declared that "drunk stories"—a play on a statement by far-right populist politician Heinz-Christian Strache downplaying the Ibiza Affair—were best left to the professionals. A nationwide campaign was obviously infeasible, so BIER focused on Vienna and was ultimately able to amass enough support there to appear on the ballot. According to a July 2019 online poll of the tabloid newspaper Österreich, 23% of respondents could imagine voting for the Beer Party under certain circumstances. In the election the party ultimately won 4,946 votes corresponding to 0.6% in Vienna and 0.1% Austria-wide.

2020 Viennese state election 
Immediately after the announcement of the results of the 2019 National Council election, the Beer Party announced its intention to launch a campaign for the 2020 Viennese State Election. However, collecting the necessary 1800 signed declarations of support posed a logistical problem due to the shutdown-measures put in place during the COVID-19 pandemic in Austria. The Beer Party pointed out that this was especially problematic for small parties that depend on direct contact with voters and criticized the situation as unfair. Still, even without external sponsors the Beer Party was able to gather enough support to enter the election. For the concurrently occurring 2020 district representative election, the party ran candidates for district representative in every Viennese district except the 1st.

The campaign kicked off with a "beer rally" lead by Pogo and his functionaries from throughout all 23 districts. One of the party's election promises was to replace the Hochstrahlbrunnen, a fountain in Schwarzenbergplatz, with a beer fountain. Among the more serious goals of the Beer Party were support through the corona crisis for Vienna's culture scene, which was badly hit by pandemic lockdown measures. The Beer Party was, by October 2020 notably able to capture more social media engagement than any other party—including the major parties—with a budget of only 200 Euros despite the competition having invested tens of thousands in advertisement. Also notable was the support of Niko Alm, a former member of the National Council who campaigned for the Beer Party.

With 1.8% of the vote, the Beer Party did not win representation in the Landtag. However, the party did win mandates in 11 of Vienna's districts. Since the party only put forward a total of six candidates for the election, representative for the remaining mandates had to be nominated afterwards. The party leader, Pogo, will serve as a representative for Simmering, the 11th district.

Pogo indicated that a future goal for the party will be the election for federal president anticipated to be held in 2022.

2022 Austrian presidential election
In a press conference on 13 June 2022, Marco Pogo announced that he intended to put into practice his candidacy for the federal presidential election in Austria 2022, which he had already mentioned after the Vienna provincial and municipal elections. On 19 August, he announced that he had collected the necessary 6,000 declarations of support. In the election, Pogo, under his legal name Dominik Wlazny, achieved 8.3%, putting him in third place behind the re-elected incumbent Alexander Van der Bellen and Walter Rosenkranz of the FPÖ.

Positions 
According to its constitution, the Beer Party understands itself as a "beerocratic movement" (bierokratische Bewegung). In a "beerocracy" (Bierokratie), power comes from beer. The party recognizes the importance of freedom of opinion, for example in the free choice of beer variety. Beer consumption should be publicly observed, and "people with less drinking talent" should be given special support. The Beer Party believes that diversity and individuality within the brewing culture enrich life, and therefore support the tolerance of foreign beers. This tolerance is not extended to Radlers, which the party officially opposes.

10-point program (2020 election) 
The Beer Party summarizes its broader platform in 10 points ranging from obviously satirical to serious:

 A beer fountain for Vienna replacing the Hochstrahlbrunnen
 Allow outdoor dining in winter
 Mandatory aptitude test for politicians
 Cover fixed pandemic-related costs to save the culture scene
 Abolish mandatory closing times for restaurants and bars
 Abolish tax on drinks in bars/restaurants and compensate with a new 50% tax on Radlers and "other atrocities"
 Universal monthly provision of a barrel of beer to all Austrian households (50L per adult and 20L per child)
 Banning Radlers in Vienna and instituting a Radler buyback program exchanging Radlers for beer
 Increasing voter turnout by allowing voters to "return the seriousness to Austrian politics that it deserves"
 A person is a person, live and let live (except for Radler-drinkers)

Electoral results

National Council

President

External links 

 The Beer Party on Facebook
 Turbobier's website
 The Beer Party's website

References 

Beer political parties
Political parties in Austria